Football Club Reno is a Jamaican football team based in Savanna-la-Mar, the capital of the parish of Westmoreland, in western Jamaica. Their home stadium is Frome Sports Club, which can hold a capacity of up to 2,000. The club was known as Reno FC until 2015, when the name was reworked to FC Reno.

History
Reno were Jamaican champions three times in the 1990s. After over 10 years in the NPL, they were relegated to the Western Super League in 2009, only to return in 2010 after a year in the second division. They were, however, relegated again in 2012.

Achievements
National Premier League: 3
1990, 1991, 1995

Western Confederation Super League: 1
2010

JFF Champions Cup: 3
1995, 1996, 2014

Current squad

Retired numbers
7 –  Caple Donaldson, midfielder – posthumous honour.

References

External links
 Team profile at Golocaljamaica

Football clubs in Jamaica
Westmoreland Parish